Needle may refer to:

Crafting
 Crochet needle, a tool for making loops in thread or yarn
 Knitting needle, a tool for knitting, not as sharp as a sewing needle
 Sewing needle, a long slender tool with a pointed tip
 Trussing needle, a long slender tool, sometimes with a flattened point, to tie poultry for cooking
 Upholstery needle, a tool for upholstery, generally thick and curved

Science and technology

Botany
 Needle (botany), of conifers

Medicine
 Hypodermic needle, a hollow needle commonly used with a syringe to inject fluid into or extract fluid from the body
 Surgical needle, several types of needles used for surgical suture
 Tuohy needle, a needle used to administer epidural catheters

Technology
 Acupuncture needle, in alternative medicine
 Gramophone needle, used for playing records
 Indicator needle, of a measuring instrument
 Needle valve

Places
 Needle Rocks, Tasmania, Australia
 Needle (stack), a sea stack on the island of Hoy, Orkney, Scotland
 Needle Mountains, Colorado, United States
 Needles, California, United States

Arts and entertainment

Music
 Needle (band), an American industrial rock band
 "Needle", a song on the album All for One by The Screaming Jets

Films
 Needle (1990 film), a television film by Jimmy McGovern
 Needle (2010 film), a supernatural horror film
 The Needle (1988 film), a Soviet film starring Viktor Tsoi

Other arts and entertainment
 Needle (novel), by Hal Clement
 Needle (comics), a Marvel Comics character
 Needle (module), a 1987 Dungeons & Dragons module

Other uses
 Dave Needle (1947–2016), American engineer
 USS Needle (SP-649), a United States Navy patrol boat in commission from 1917 to 1919
 Needle, a cheerleading stunt
 Sharon Needles (born 1981), American drag queen

See also
 Space Needle, Seattle, Washington
 The Needles (disambiguation), also Needles
 L'Aiguille ("the Needle"), part of a chalk formation in Étretat, France
 Needle gun (disambiguation)
 Needlefish (disambiguation)
 The Needler or needlegun
 Needle play